The 2021 Women's Baseball World Cup would have been the ninth edition of the WBSC Women's Baseball World Cup, the biennial international women's baseball world championship tournament. The competition was planned to be held in Tijuana, Mexico in late 2021, with dates to be announced. The competition was originally to be held in Monterrey, Mexico from 11 to 20 September 2020, and was initially rescheduled to be held in Tijuana from 1 to 9 March 2021, but was postponed both times due to the COVID-19 pandemic. The tournament was cancelled altogether in October 2021.

Three national teams, hosts Mexico, France and the Philippines were supposed to make their debut in the tournament.

Qualification

References

External links
WBWC website

Women's Baseball World Cup
2020s in women's baseball
2021 in baseball
Women's Baseball World Cup
Baseball World Cup
Women's Baseball World Cup
International baseball competitions hosted by Mexico
Sports in Tijuana
21st century in Tijuana
Sports competitions in Baja California